Steve Harshman is an American politician and a Republican member of the Wyoming House of Representatives representing District 37 since January 14, 2003. Harshman served as the Speaker of the Wyoming House from January 2017 to January 2021.

Education
Harshman earned his Bachelor of Science in education from Black Hills State University and his Master of Education from Oregon State University.

Elections

2002 - When incumbent Republican Speaker of the House Rick Tempest was term-limited (since repealed), Harshman won the Republican primary with 47.6% of the vote. Harshman defeated Democratic nominee Jo Koch with 62.2% of the vote.
2004 - Harshman defeated Kathy Martin in the Republican primary with 69.4% of the vote. He defeated Democratic nominee Scott Koenekamp with 70% of the vote.
2006 - Harshman defeated Nick Mandis in the Republican primary with 82.0% of the vote. He defeated 2004 Democratic nominee Scott Koenekamp in the general election with 70.2% of the vote.
2008 - Harshman ran unopposed in both the Republican primary and general election.
2010 - Harshman ran unopposed in both the Republican primary and general election.
2012 - Harshman defeated Steve Bray in the Republican primary with 68.5% of the vote and ran unopposed in the general election.
2014 - Harshman defeated Greg Flesvig in the Republican primary with 70% of the vote. He then defeated independent candidate Anthony Allen in the general election with 73% of the vote.
2016 - Harshman defeated Greg Flesvig with 74% of the vote in a rematch of the 2014 Republican primary. Harshman defeated Democrat Deirdre Stoelzle in the general election with 80% of the vote.  In November 2016, the Wyoming House Republican Caucus nominated Harshman to be Speaker of the Wyoming House of Representatives. Harshman will succeed Kermit Brown, who is retiring.

References

External links
Official page at the Wyoming Legislature
 

21st-century American politicians
Black Hills State University alumni
Living people
Oregon State University alumni
Politicians from Casper, Wyoming
Speakers of the Wyoming House of Representatives
Republican Party members of the Wyoming House of Representatives
Year of birth missing (living people)